Markham College of Commerce caters to the educational needs of students in Hazaribag district in India. It initiated commerce teaching up to degree level in its North Chotanagpur headquarters.

It was founded on February 10, 1974 by B. D. Jaiswal.

It was named after educationist Arthur Francis Markham who came to India with his goal to make higher education to the students of the area.

Markham was ordained with the Order of British Empire. He later became the Vice Chancellor of the Ranchi University. Even after his retirement, he remained engaged with the students. In 1974, the first session of Intermediate Arts and Commerce was started. Three years later, Ranchi awarded affiliation for the subjects Hindi, English, Sanskrit, History, Economics, Political Science, Philosophy and Commerce up to degree level.

At the time of foundation, Dr. Maheshwar Tiwari, who as a founder Principal and in charge of the college took a noble initiative with a short but dedicated team consisting of Prof. Shashi Kishore Narayan ( Deptt. Of Pol. Sc), Prof. Heyat Ahmed (Deptt.Of History), Prof. Sabita Banerjee (Deptt.Of Philosophy), Prof. Aparna Banerjee (Deptt. of Sanskrit), Prof. Nitay Nand Choudhary (Deptt. of Commerce).

Sri Kameshwar Upadhyay (Deptt. of Eco), In spite of financial constraints that this college had to face for years together during its neo-natal period, the love and patronage that this institution received from the students and their guardians culminated in its ever-glowing growth and today it boasts of providing education to over eight thousand students annually on an average with 80% success rate.

Later Dr. Sheo Dayal Singh joined this college as the Principal and his contribution gave solid and firm foundation to this college. It was at his initiation that the college was shifted to the present premises of ‘Nanda Bhawan’ on the Barkagaon Road, in the year 1979. His services made an indelible imprint on the academic canvas of not only of this college but of North Chhotanagpur as well. Later Sri Binod Kumar Sharan (Deptt. Of English), Dr. Shambhu Nath Mishra (Deptt. of Sanskrit), Sri Gopal Krishna Sinha (Deptt.Of Philosophy), Sri Rajeev Nayan Sinha (Deptt. of Commerce) joined this college and contributed their services. The college as per decision of the Govt., converted into a constituent unit, on 31 October 1986 during the tenure of late Lambodar Pathak as the secretary.

Though surrounded by a financially deprived tribal, SC & OBC population the college had a dedicated team and today it is the Alma Mater of a galaxy of financial administrators, chartered accountants, doctors, engineers, civil servants, bank personnel, military, para-military and police officials among its students alumni.

As of today, the college is having a good Library with approximately 12000 titles, 42 lecture theaters, teacher's common room, a spacious multipurpose hall named ‘Swami Vivekanand Sabhagar’ that can accommodate some 2000 persons at a time.

To cater the Vocational aspirations of the Students, the college started Bachelor course in Taxation Laws and Practices (TLP), Bachelor of Journalism & Mass Communication (BJMC), Medical Lab Technology (MLT) from 2009. Besides the above noted Vocational courses, Nalanda Open University (NOU) is having its full-fledged branch in this college campus. It is offering distance education to the students of whole Chhotanagpur region.

The college also houses a full-fledged Nationalized Bank (United Bank of India) in its premises to facilitate its students, teachers and the non-teaching staff. The college also has NCC, NSS (Two units) Athletics and cultural wings. Today it feels privileged being the honored recipient of a number of prizes awarded at University, Inter University, State & National levels.

Most of the teachers are honored with Ph. D. Degree. Two teachers have completed Minor Research Project under University Grant Commission (UGC). Two teachers have been honored with best teachers award by the HRD, Govt. of Jharkhand. Good number of teachers had attended International, National and State conferences. Some important and valuable books have published by the teachers along with the publication of many articles in reputed National & International Journals. In University system the teachers of this college have contributed at every sphere.

Thus the emblem of the college "SA VIDYA YA VIMUKTAYE" i.e. real education is freedom from ‘bondage’ is really visualized in the alumni that this college produces every year and the college fraternity are working day in and day out bringing freedom from the bondage of ignorance to the ever aspiring youths leading them towards a blissful blessed life.

History
The college was established in the late 1970s. It was founded by  Shiv Dayal Singh and named after ex-principal Sir Markham Sahab. The college initially had 5 students and has now grown to a strength of 10,000 students soon after.

The college has a very scenic campus. College now has almost all the streams under science and Arts as well. But that has never compromised on the quality commerce education.

The college is part of the Vinoba Bhave University and is one of the oldest colleges of this university.

See also
Education in India
Literacy in India
List of institutions of higher education in Jharkhand

References

External links
www.markhamcollege.ac.in/

Colleges affiliated to Vinoba Bhave University
Universities and colleges in Jharkhand
Hazaribagh
1974 establishments in Bihar
Educational institutions established in 1974